The Front for the Liberation of the Golan is a guerrilla organization formed by Syria in July 2006 shortly after the 2006 Lebanon War, viewed by Syria as a victory by Hezbollah over Israel. Its aim is to recover the Golan Heights from Israel through a military campaign. The force is trained by Hezbollah, which in turn was trained by Iran. 
It is made up of hundreds of Syrian volunteers and Palestinian refugees living in the Damascus area.

References

Arab militant groups
Golan Heights
Guerrilla organizations
Hezbollah
History of Quneitra Governorate
Iran–Syria relations
Islamic Revolutionary Guard Corps
National liberation armies
Paramilitary organizations based in Syria